Tom Schütz (born 20 January 1988) is a German former professional footballer who played as a defensive midfielder or centre-back.

Career
Schütz retired from playing in November 2020.

Career statistics

References

External links
 

1988 births
Living people
Association football defenders
Association football midfielders
German footballers
Germany youth international footballers
FC Bayern Munich II players
SV Babelsberg 03 players
Arminia Bielefeld players
2. Bundesliga players
3. Liga players
Regionalliga players
Sportspeople from Bamberg
Footballers from Bavaria